Peter Lotharius Oxholm (10 July 1753 – 27 July 1827) was a Danish army officer and governor-general of the Danish West Indies from 1815 to 1816. He also participated in the Battle of Køge against the British troops in 1807.

In 1814, Oxholm was appointed governor-general of the Danish West Indies.

Early life
Oxholm was born on 10 July 1753 in Copenhagen, the son of krigsråd Lorentz Oxholm (1702 or 1714–68) and Marie Susanne Oxgilm née Schultz (1730–82). His father worked as mønsterskriver at Holmen.

Military career 

Oxholm enrolled as a cadet in 1763 and was made corporal in 1769. From 1771 Oxholm was page to Queen Carolina Mathilda, and he was present at her arrest in 1772. After having served in Denmark, he left for the Danish West Indies as a lieutenant in 1777.

Oxholm returned to Denmark in 1797 and was dismissed from the army with the rank of colonel. During the English Wars, Oxholm became leader of a regiment (Søndre Sjællandske Landeværnsregiment – the Regiment of Southern Zealand in English) in the militia created in 1801. This militia participated in the Battle of Køge, where Oxholm together with a handful of soldiers barricaded themselves in the cemetery at Herfølge, a small town in the middle of Zealand. After a brief and intense battle, they were forced to surrender and were taken prisoner.

Plantation owner
Once Oxholm arrived on the island of Saint Croix, he became a planter, purchasing enslaved Africans to work on plantations on the island. From 1782 onwards, Oxholm also became involved in the Danish slave trade; protesting against its abolition and attempting to "get the trade extended beyond the ban of 1803".

He was the owner of the St. George Hill, Sally's Fancy, and Hope plantations.

Personal life and property
Oxholm was first married to Marie Heiliger, who died in 1794, and later to Ann O'Neill (3 February 1780 – 16 August 1844), daughter of a plantation owner on St. Croix.

He purchased a mansion of the corner of Sankt Annæ Gade and Amaliegade in 1808. He also owned the country house Aldershvile north of Copenhagen.

References

External links

 Peter Lotharius Oxholm  at geni.com

Governors of the Danish West Indies
1753 births
1827 deaths
19th-century Danish military personnel
19th-century Danish politicians
19th century in the Danish West Indies
Danish military personnel of the Napoleonic Wars
Danish planters
Danish slave owners
Danish sugar plantation owners
Napoleonic Wars prisoners of war held by the United Kingdom
Oxholm family